Who's That Soldier? is a Czech comedy film directed by Petr Tuček. It was released in 1987.

Cast
 Jiří Langmajer - Milan Kouba
 Karel Roden - Captain Tůma
 Veronika Gajerová - Vlasta
 Václav Čížkovský - Sany
 Pavel Hejlík - Šlapetka
 Ivo Helikar - Honza
 Miriam Hynková - Grandmother
 Vítězslav Jandák - Major Průcha
 Tomás Karger - Trunacek
 Michal Kocourek
 Jan Kraus - Soldier
 Jan Kuželka
 Daniel Landa - Soldier
 Vlasta Mészárosová - Lenka

External links
 

1987 films
1987 comedy films
Czech comedy films
Films scored by Petr Hapka
Films about the Czechoslovak Army
1980s Czech films